"Something New"  is a song by American rapper Wiz Khalifa, featuring American singer and Taylor Gang label mate Ty Dolla Sign for his sixth studio album Rolling Papers 2 (2018). It was released for digital download on August 11, 2017 by Atlantic Records as the album's lead single. It was produced by Ayo n Keyz & Hitmaka. It heavily samples Zapp's 1986 single "Computer Love". The song received renewed popularity in 2020, thanks to its use in TikTok videos.

Background
Wiz and Ty previewed the song and clips of the music video several times on Instagram throughout July 2017.

Composition
"Something New" is a "feel-good love song" featuring smooth, sultry vocals and a rhythmic chorus from Ty Dolla $ign.

Commercial performance
"Something New" was the most added song to mainstream urban contemporary radio upon its release.

TikTok dance challenge

In early 2020, the song began going viral on video-sharing app TikTok, due to a dance challenge. The challenge sees participants line up behind each other, with one person in front to kick off the dance, and everyone else then proceeding to push each elbow out to the side before shimmying along to the song's chorus and then clapping along to the beat.

Music video 
On August 14, 2017, Wiz uploaded the official music video for "Something New".

Charts

Certifications

Release history

References

2017 songs
Wiz Khalifa songs
Songs written by Wiz Khalifa
2017 singles
Ty Dolla Sign songs
Atlantic Records singles
Songs written by Ty Dolla Sign
Songs written by Hitmaka